The 2018–19 FIS Ski Jumping World Cup was the 40th World Cup season in ski jumping for men, the 22nd official World Cup season in ski flying, and the 8th World Cup season for ladies. The season began on 17 November 2018 in Wisła for men and in Lillehammer for ladies; the season concluded on 24 March 2019 in Planica for men and in Chaykovsky for ladies.

The first edition of ladies' Raw Air was organized simultaneously with men's edition between 9–14 March 2019. 

And at the end of the season new tournament called "Russia Tour Blue Bird" for ladies was organized in Nizhny Tagil and Chaykovsky between 16–24 March 2019. 

New rules have been introduced at the 2018 Fall meeting in Zürich: from now on one Continental Cup point will be enough to perform at the Ski Flying event and not one World Cup point anymore. Also all qualification rounds awarded with 3,000 CHF and Ski Flying qualifications with 5,000 CHF from this season on.

Map of world cup hosts 
All 26 locations hosting world cup events for men (19) and ladies (14) in this season. 

 Raw Air
 Planica7
 Willingen Five
 Four Hills Tournament
 Russia Tour Blue Bird

Calendar

Men

Ladies

Men's team

Ladies' team

Men's standings

Overall

Nations Cup

Prize money

Ski Flying

Four Hills Tournament

Willingen Five

Raw Air

Planica7

Ladies' standings

Overall

Nations Cup

Prize money

Lillehammer Triple

Raw Air

Russia Tour Blue Bird

Yellow bib timeline

Men

Ladies

Ski Flying

Four Hills Tournament

Raw Air

Planica7

Willingen Five

Russia Tour Blue Bird

Lillehammer Triple

Qualifications

Men

Ladies

Achievements 

First World Cup career victory

Men
 Evgeniy Klimov (24), in his fourth season – the WC 1 in Wisła
 Ryoyu Kobayashi (22), in his fourth season – the WC 2 in Ruka
 Karl Geiger (25), in his seventh season – the WC 6 in Engelberg
 Dawid Kubacki (28), in his twelfth season – the WC 13 in Val di Fiemme
 Timi Zajc (18), in his second season – the WC 17 in Oberstdorf
 Markus Eisenbichler (27), in his eighth season – the WC 27 in Planica

Women
 Juliane Seyfarth (28), in her eighth season – the WC 1 in Lillehammer
 Lidiia Iakovleva (17), in her second season – the WC 2 in Lillehammer

First World Cup podium

Men
 Stephan Leyhe (26), in his seventh season – the WC 1 in Wisła
 Ryoyu Kobayashi (22), in his fourth season – the WC 1 in Wisła
 Daniel Huber (25), in his fifth season – the WC 6 in Engelberg
 Yukiya Satō (23), in his fifth season – the WC 14 in Zakopane
 Timi Zajc (18), in his second season – the WC 16 in Sapporo

Women
 Juliane Seyfarth (28), in her eighth season – the WC 1 in Lillehammer
 Lidiia Iakovleva (17), in her second season – the WC 2 in Lillehammer
 Ramona Straub (25), in her eighth season – the WC 3 in Lillehammer
 Anna Odine Strøm (21), in her sixth season – the WC 9 in Zaō
 Urša Bogataj (23), in her eighth season – the WC 14 in Ljubno

Number of wins this season (in brackets are all-time wins)

Men
 Ryōyū Kobayashi – 13 (13)
 Stefan Kraft – 4 (16)
 Kamil Stoch – 2 (33)
 Karl Geiger – 2 (2)
 Domen Prevc – 1 (5)
 Johann André Forfang – 1 (3)
 Robert Johansson – 1 (2)
 Evgeniy Klimov – 1 (1)
 Dawid Kubacki – 1 (1)
 Timi Zajc – 1 (1)
 Markus Eisenbichler – 1 (1)

Women
 Maren Lundby – 12 (25)
 Juliane Seyfarth – 4 (4)
 Daniela Iraschko-Stolz – 3 (16)
 Katharina Althaus – 3 (7)
 Sara Takanashi – 1 (56)
 Lidiia Iakovleva – 1 (1)

Retirements
 Andreas Stjernen - 1 victories, 7 podiums, 166 starts in WC
 Robert Kranjec - 7 victories, 27 podiums, 325 starts in WC
 Davide Bresadola
 Sebastian Colloredo
 Kenneth Gangnes
 Tomaž Naglič
 Luca Egloff
 Andreas Kofler
 Lukáš Hlava
 Andreas Wank
 Tomáš Vančura

Footnotes

References 

FIS Ski Jumping World Cup
World cup
World cup